James Gamble Rogers IV (January 31, 1937 – October 10, 1991) was an American folk artist musician and storyteller known for the recurring theme in his songs and stories about characters and places in a fictional Florida county. He was a 1998 inductee into the Florida Artists Hall of Fame.

Biography
Born in Winter Park, Florida, Rogers was the namesake of two architects in the family – his father James Gamble Rogers II and great-uncle James Gamble Rogers. As a young man, he chose to become a musician—while on his way to interview for a job at an architecture firm, he attended a Serendipity Singers audition in New York City, borrowed a guitar, tried out, and was admitted to the group.

Gamble Rogers began performing around Florida in the 1960s, often performing with other Florida singer-songwriters Paul Champion, Jim Bellew, and Will McLean. By the 1970s, he was a regular fixture at the Florida Folk Festival, often as the headliner. He appeared in James Szalapski's 1976 country music documentary film Heartworn Highways, performing an onstage comic monologue followed by "Black Label Blues." By the 1980s, he was often featured on public television and public radio. As a self-described "modern troubadour," Rogers influenced musicians such as Jimmy Buffett and David Bromberg, with the former dedicating his album Fruitcakes to him. In their tribute to him, "Song for Gamble," Steve Gillette and his wife Cindy Mangsen describe him: "He had the gift of innocence, and a fondness for the key of 'E'."

While Rogers was camping at Flagler Beach, a frightened young girl ran to him, begging him to help her father, who was in trouble in rough surf. Compromised by spinal arthritis that had been worsening since childhood, Rogers nevertheless grabbed an air mattress and headed into the ocean in a rescue attempt. Both men died in the surf. In honor of his heroism, the Florida Legislature renamed the state park Gamble Rogers Memorial State Recreation Area at Flagler Beach. In St. Augustine, Florida, there is a middle school, Gamble Rogers Middle School, named after him.

Rogers received a tribute in the pages of Record Collector in 2023.

Songs and stories
The characters and places in the fictional Oklawaha County, are a recurring theme in Rogers' songs and stories, although his earlier works referenced characters of the same names residing in non-fictional Winter Park, Florida, and Habersham County, Georgia.

Through years of onstage apprenticeship, Rogers refined and polished his one-man show into a single story line – a continuum he entitled, Oklawaha County Laissez-Faire.

Oklawaha records

During the years since Rogers' death, his agent and business manager, Charles Steadham, acquired the intellectual property rights to Rogers' work and founded Oklawaha Records in Gainesville, Florida to present this material. Steadham has remastered and re-released most of Rogers' songs and stories, making them available through the website of the not-for-profit Gamble Rogers Memorial Foundation, Inc.

Award
Gamble Rogers was posthumously awarded the Kiwanis Award for bravery, the Carnegie Award for heroism, induction into the Florida Artists Hall of Fame and the NSA Lifetime Achievement Award (2001).

References

External links
 Gamble Rogers Memorial Foundation
Recording of Rogers performing "Orange Blossom Special" at the 1982 Florida Folk Festival
Florida Folklife Collection; images and recordings
Gamble Rogers Memorial State Recreation homepage from the Florida Park Service online guide
 Gamble Rogers Folk Festival

1937 births
1991 deaths
20th-century American guitarists
20th-century American singers
American folk guitarists
American folk musicians
American male guitarists
Deaths by drowning in the United States
Folk record labels
Guitarists from Florida
People from Winter Park, Florida
Singer-songwriters from Florida
20th-century American male musicians
American male singer-songwriters